Caridad Canelón (born May 16, 1955), is a Venezuelan television actress. She has worked as an actress of telenovelas for Radio Caracas Televisión and Venevisión.

Filmography

Films

Television

References

External links 

1955 births
Living people
20th-century Venezuelan actresses
21st-century Venezuelan actresses
Actresses from Caracas
RCTV personalities
Venezuelan telenovela actresses